The Championship of Texas, formerly known as AutoParts4Less.com MotoAmerica Championship of Texas, for sponsorship reasons, is a MotoAmerica race that was held for the first time in the 2015 season at Circuit of the Americas. It is usually the first or second race on the MotoAmerica schedule. MotoGP and MotoAmerica have raced in the same weekend at Circuit of the Americas from 2015-2019, were due to race again for the 2020 and 2021 season but it got cancelled. For the 2022 season, MotoAmerica will act as a support event for the 2022 Motorcycle Grand Prix of the Americas once again which is scheduled to be on April 8-10.

The 2020 race was cancelled due to the outbreak of COVID-19. The 2021 race was not added to the 2021 MotoAmerica Schedule.

Official names and sponsors
2015–2019: MotoAmerica Championship of Texas, 2022: AUTOPARTS4LESS.COM MotoAmerica Championship of Texas, 2023-present: MotoAmerica Championship of Texas

Winners of the Championship of Texas

Multiple winners (riders)

Multiple winners (manufacturers)

By year
Note: Results are by order from Supersport to Superbike. 2015/2016 Superstock 1000 nor 2022 Superbike results are not available on PDF.

References

Recurring sporting events established in 2015
2015 establishments in Texas
Circuit of the Americas

External links
 Circuit of the Americas – Official website
 Official website